Jack Frost is a 1998 American Christmas fantasy comedy film directed by Troy Miller and starring Michael Keaton and Kelly Preston. Keaton plays the title character, a father and musician killed in a car accident, only to be brought back to life in the form of a snowman via a magical harmonica. It received mixed to negative reviews and became a box-office bomb, grossing just $34 million against a budget of $40–85 million.

Three of Frank Zappa's four children, Dweezil Zappa, Ahmet Zappa, and Moon Unit Zappa, appear in the film.

Plot
Jack Frost is the lead singer in a rock band based in the fictional town of Medford, Colorado. His focus on his music and hopes that the band will sign a record deal leads him to neglect his family, including his 11-year-old son Charlie.

Charlie and Jack build a snowman together, and Jack gives Charlie his best harmonica, which he got the day Charlie was born. He jokingly tells Charlie that it's magical and that Jack will be able to hear it wherever he is. Jack promises his wife Gabby that he will attend Charlie's hockey game, but misses it in favor of recording a new hit song. To make up for it, Jack then promises to take his family on a Christmas trip to the mountains but is then called in on a gig that could make or break his career. On his way to the gig, Jack realizes his mistake and borrows his best friend (and the band's keyboardist) Mac MacArthur's car to go to the mountains to meet his family. Unfortunately, Jack encounters a bad snowstorm, crashes the car, and is killed.

A year later, Charlie has fallen into depression over his father's death. One night, he makes another snowman that bears as much resemblance to Jack as he can remember and plays Jack's harmonica just before going to sleep. The harmonica turns out to be magical after all, as it revives Jack, transferring his spirit into the snowman. Jack attempts to greet Charlie, but ends up terrifying him instead. After Jack uses his nickname "Charlie boy", Charlie realizes that the snowman is his father. Jack reconnects with Charlie and teaches him the values that he never got when he was alive. Jack convinces Charlie to rejoin his hockey team instead of continuing to grieve over his death. Meanwhile, Mac continues to be a friend of the family, while also becoming a father figure to Charlie.

As winter ends, Jack begins melting and struggles to get to Charlie's hockey game, but is successful in doing so. Afterward, Charlie decides to take Jack to the mountains where it is colder, but has a difficult time convincing Gabby to do so. Jack and Charlie arrive at the isolated cabin that the family was going to stay at for Christmas before Jack's death. Jack calls Gabby, nonchalantly asking her to come to the cabin to pick up Charlie; Gabby is shocked, but recognizes his voice and obliges. Jack tells a disheartened Charlie that he has to leave. When Gabby arrives, the snowman shell dissipates without the scarf, gloves, and hat, revealing Jack in an ethereal form. Jack tells Charlie he will be with him wherever he goes and, after saying farewell and giving his love to both his wife and son, returns to the afterlife.

Cast

Live action

Puppeteers
 Denise Chershire Pearlman as Jack Frost (head operator)
 Bruce Lanoil as Jack Frost (in-suit performer)
 Denise Cheshire as Jack Frost (in-suit performer)
 Allan Trautman as Jack Frost (additional puppeteer)

Production
The costume for Jack Frost's snowman form was created by Jim Henson's Creature Shop. George Clooney was originally set to star as Jack Frost and Jim Henson's Creature Shop made the character look like Clooney before Clooney left the project. Sam Raimi was originally attached to direct the film but when Clooney dropped out he dropped out as well.

John Travolta was also considered for the lead role and Billy Bob Thornton was in talks for the role of Mac MacArthur.

Principal photography began on March 16, 1998, and wrapped on June 23, 1998.

Release
Jack Frost was released in Australia on December 10, 1998, a day prior to its American release.

Music  

Featured on the CD release, released by Mercury Records:

The film features additional tracks not featured on the CD:

 "Roll with the Changes" – REO Speedwagon
 "Everytime We Say Goodbye" – Cole Porter
 "Rock and Roll (Part 2)" – Gary Glitter
 "Don't Lose Your Faith" – The Jack Frost Band
 "Couldn't Stand the Weather" – Stevie Ray Vaughan
 "Landslide" – Fleetwood Mac
 "Free Ride" – The Edgar Winter Group
 "Final Fire" – Hans Zimmer
 "Hot in the City" – Billy Idol
 "Slow Ride" – Foghat

Reception

Box office
Produced on an $85 million budget, Jack Frost took $7 million on its opening weekend.
It went on to gross over $34.5 million in North America, becoming a box office flop.

Critical response
On review aggregator Rotten Tomatoes the film holds an approval rating of 19% based on 58 reviews, with an average score of 3.90/10. The website's critical consensus reads, "Sentimental schmaltz and uninspired storytelling sink this film." 
On Metacritic, the film received a score of 40 based on 25 reviews, indicating "mixed or average reviews".
Audiences surveyed by CinemaScore gave the film a grade B+ on a scale of A to F.

Roger Ebert gave the film one out of four stars, writing, "It's possible for the Jim Henson folks and Industrial Light and Magic to put their heads together and come up with the most repulsive single creature in the history of special effects, and I am not forgetting the Chucky doll or the desert intestine from Star Wars." Ben Falk of Empire Magazine gave the film a three out of five stars, saying, "Despite an astoundingly dodgy-looking central character, this is a children's flick that doesn't apologise for being so and in an environment where even cartoons are stuffed full of gags purely for the grown-ups, that's remarkably refreshing." Janet Maslin of The New York Times gave the film a positive review, saying: "As one more Hollywood effort to look on the sunny side of fatality, Jack Frost is so sugarcoated that it makes other recent efforts in this genre look blisteringly honest. On the other hand, it's just cheerful and bogus enough to keep children reasonably entertained."

See also
 List of Christmas films

References

External links
 
 

1998 comedy films
1998 directorial debut films
1998 films
1998 fantasy films
1990s fantasy comedy films
American Christmas comedy films
American fantasy comedy films
Films about father–son relationships
Films about reincarnation
Puppet films
Films scored by Trevor Rabin
Films directed by Troy Miller
Fictional snowmen
Films set in Canada
Films with screenplays by Jonathan Roberts (writer)
Films with screenplays by Mark Steven Johnson
Jack Frost
Warner Bros. films
1990s English-language films
1990s American films